Peltodoris lentiginosa, also known as the mottled pale sea lemon or the giant freckled dorid, is a species of sea slug. It is a dorid nudibranch in the family Discordorididae.

Description 
Peltodoris lentiginosa's dorsum is covered in tubercules, giving it a bumpy texture. Its coloration is splotchy, with different shades of brown patches covering its body; however, pure white coloration has also been observed. It has six gills which are white to off-white in coloration and located toward the back of its body; its rhinophores share this coloration. Its length is approximately 18 cm.

Distribution 
Peltodoris lentiginosa has been recorded from Kodiak Island, Alaska, to Capa Arago, Oregon. It is found primarily at intertidal depths to around 33 m

Ecology 
Peltodoris lentiginosa feeds on yellow encrusting sponges. It has also been observed to feed on glass sponges..

References 

  Millen, S.V. (1982). A new species of dorid nudibranch (Opisthobranchia: Mollusca) belonging to the genus Anisodoris. Canadian Journal of Zoology. 60: 2694-2705

Peltodoris